is a Japanese racewalker. He competed in the 50 kilometres walk event at the 2017 World Championships in Athletics in London, UK, placing third and receiving a bronze medal.

See also
Japan at the 2017 World Championships in Athletics

References

Japanese male racewalkers
Living people
Athletes from Tokyo
1993 births
World Athletics Championships athletes for Japan
World Athletics Championships medalists
20th-century Japanese people
21st-century Japanese people